San Carlos Point is the southwest entrance point of Brandy Bay, James Ross Island. A refuge hut called "Refugio San Carlos" was established on this point by the Argentine Antarctic Expedition in 1959. Following geological work in the area by British Antarctic Survey (BAS), 1981–83, the point was called "Brandy Point" in association with the bay, but later named San Carlos Point.

Headlands of James Ross Island